Khufukhaf I (also read as Khaefkhufu I) was an ancient Egyptian prince and vizier of the 4th Dynasty.

Family
Khufukhaf was a son of pharaoh Khufu, half-brother of pharaoh Djedefre and full brother of pharaoh Khafre and prince Minkhaf. His mother might have been Queen Henutsen; the latter's pyramid is next to his mastaba tomb. His wife was named Nefertkau II and she was buried with him in Giza.

Life
He served as vizier, possibly towards the end of Khufu's reign or during his brother Khafra's reign.

Tomb
Khufukhaf had a double mastaba in Giza (tomb G 7130-7140) in the east field which is part of the Giza Necropolis. Mastaba G 7130 is attributed to Khufukhaf's wife Nefertkau. G 7140 belonged to Khufukhaf himself. Khufukhaf is depicted with Queen Henutsen in the Hall of the Mastaba. Several sons are mentioned as well. A son named Wetka (also called Tuka) is depicted in the chapel of the mastaba. Another son named Iuenka (or Iun-ka) is depicted in the chapel as well. Iunka is given the title of King's Son in the tomb. Khufukhaf also had a daughter.

Titles 
Khufukhaf was part of the highest level of the administration and was elevated to the vizierate probably during the reign of Khafra, his brother. This rank, the highest at the time, was strictly reserved to the close family of the Pharaoh during the 4th dynasty. 

Main titles:

Translation and indexes from Dilwyn Jones.

Sources

Princes of the Fourth Dynasty of Egypt
Viziers of the Fourth Dynasty of Egypt
Khufu
Mastabas
Year of birth unknown
Year of death unknown